Lomalatachelys neuquina is an extinct genus and species of chelid turtle from Argentina. The specimen was found in the Loma de La Lata zone approximately 75 km from Neuquen City in north west Patagonia, Argentina.

References

Cretaceous reptiles of South America
Chelidae
Fossil Chelid Turtles
Late Cretaceous turtles
Prehistoric turtle genera
Bajo de la Carpa Formation
Extinct turtles
Cretaceous Argentina